Park Vista Community High School (PVCHS, PVHS, PV) is a public high school in Lake Worth, Florida, United States.

Academies
Park Vista Community High School offers four academies, or magnet programs, that serve as a specialization of study to the student throughout his or her years at the school. Students in the Information Technology, Medical, and Automotive academies are offered opportunities to earn industry certifications, that will be designated on students' diplomas when they graduate.

Notable alumni
Tre Mason, NFL football player and son of Vincent Mason of De La Soul, Class of 2011 
Trea Turner, MLB baseball player, Class of 2011 
Tevin Homer, NFL football player, Class of 2013

References

External links
 

Buildings and structures in Lake Worth Beach, Florida
High schools in Palm Beach County, Florida
Public high schools in Florida
Magnet schools in Florida
Educational institutions established in 2004
2004 establishments in Florida